Big Rock is a village in Kane County, Illinois, United States. It is located approximately  due west of Chicago. It is between the villages of Hinckley and Sugar Grove.

The village was incorporated on July 26, 2001. As of the 2010 census it had a population of 1,126.

Geography
Big Rock is located in southwestern Kane County at 41.759308 N, 88.537617 W. U.S. Route 30 passes through the north side of the village, leading east  to Sugar Grove and west the same distance to Hinckley.

Demographics

Education 
Big Rock Township is a part of the Hinckley-Big Rock Community Unit School District 429, which operates three schools:

Hinckley-Big Rock Elementary School is located on the west side of Hinckley on US HWY 30.

Hinckley-Big Rock Middle School is located in the center of Big Rock on US HWY 30.

Hinckley-Big Rock High School is located on the east side of Hinckley on US HWY 30.

Images

See also
Big Rock Township, Kane County, Illinois

External links
 Village of Big Rock official website
 Big Rock Forest Preserve
 Big Rock Park District
 Hinckley-Big Rock CUSD 429

References

 
Villages in Illinois
Villages in Kane County, Illinois
Populated places established in 2001
2001 establishments in Illinois